India TV is a Hindi news channel based in Noida, Uttar Pradesh, India. The channel was launched on 20 May 2004 by Rajat Sharma and wife Ritu Dhawan. The channel is a subsidiary of Independent News Service, which was co-founded by Sharma and Dhawan in 1997. A rebranding of the channel took place in February 2022.

History 
In 1997, Rajat Sharma and Ritu Dhawan set up Independent News Service (INS), the parent company which owns India TV. He co-founded India TV with his wife in April, 2004 from a studio in Film City, Noida, India TV. Its Broadcast Centre is in Sector 85, Noida, UP, India

Prior to launching India TV, Rajat Sharma was a previously the anchor of Aap Ki Adalat on Zee News and Janata Ki Adalat on Star News.

References

External links 
 
 

Hindi-language television channels in India
Television channels and stations established in 2004
24-hour television news channels in India
Mass media in Uttar Pradesh
2004 establishments in Uttar Pradesh